Lynne Beecroft (born 9 May 1957 in Comox, British Columbia) is a Canadian former field hockey player who competed in the 1984 Summer Olympics.

References

External links
 

1957 births
Living people
People from Comox, British Columbia
Canadian female field hockey players
Olympic field hockey players of Canada
Field hockey players at the 1984 Summer Olympics